Alan Francis Abernethy (born 12 April 1957) is an Irish Anglican bishop, and former Bishop of Connor.

Educated at Grosvenor High School, Belfast, Queen's University Belfast and Trinity College Dublin, and ordained in 1981, he began his ministry as Assistant Curate at St Elizabeth's, Dundonald.

After a similar post at Lecale he was Officiating Chaplain at RAF Bishopscourt. He was Rector at St John's, Helen's Bay, from 1987 to 1990 and then at St Columbanus, Ballyholme, until his appointment to the episcopate in 2007.

In 2010 he faced calls that he resign in connection with the controversy relating to the coming to an end of the composer Philip Stopford's tenure as Director of Music at St Anne's Cathedral, Belfast.

He retired in December 2019.

References

1957 births
People educated at Grosvenor Grammar School
Alumni of Queen's University Belfast
Alumni of Trinity College Dublin
21st-century Anglican bishops in Ireland
Bishops of Connor
Living people
Irish military chaplains